Little Lithodendron Wash (also known as Carrizo Wash or Little Carrizo Wash) is a stream located in Navajo County, Arizona, east of Sun Valley and west of the ghost town of Adamana. 

It flows into the Puerco River, a tributary of the Little Colorado River.

The term Carrizo Wash has also applied to Lithodendron Wash, which is a roughly parallel wash just to the east, which also flows into the Puerco River.  The two washes are, or once were, considered two branches of this Carrizo Wash.

References

Rivers of Navajo County, Arizona
Rivers of Arizona